A list of films produced in France in 1997.

External links
 1997 in France
 French films of 1997 at the Internet Movie Database
French films of 1997 at Cinema-francais.fr

1997
Films
French